An annulet is a small square component in the Doric capital, under the quarter-round.

An annulet is also a narrow flat architectural moulding, common in other parts of a column, viz. the bases,  as well as the capital. It is so called, because it encompasses the column round. In this sense, annulet is frequently used for baguette or little astragal.

References 

 

Columns and entablature
Ornaments (architecture)